Agaricus agrinferus is a species of fungi in the genus Agaricus . Agaricus agrinferus is found in the northern hemisphere in places such as California.

References 

agrinferus

Fungi described in 2008